Bairampur may refer to:

 Bairampur, Bangladesh
 Bairampur, Uttar Pradesh, India
 Bairampur, Raebareli, a village in Uttar Pradesh, India